The Australian National Heritage List or National Heritage List (NHL) is a heritage register, a list of national heritage places deemed to be of outstanding heritage significance to Australia, established in 2003. The list includes natural and historic places, including those of cultural significance to Indigenous Australians such as Aboriginal Australian sacred sites. Having been assessed against a set list of criteria, once a place is put on the National Heritage List, the provisions of the Environment Protection and Biodiversity Conservation Act 1999 (EPBC Act) apply.

All places on this list can be found on the online Australian Heritage Database, along with other places on other Australian and world heritage listings.

History
The National Heritage List was established in 2003 by an amendment to the Environment Protection and Biodiversity Conservation Act 1999.

The National Heritage List, together with the Commonwealth Heritage List, replaced the former Register of the National Estate, which was closed and archived in 2007. Places on the National Heritage List are places of outstanding heritage value for Australia, while the Commonwealth Heritage List are heritage places that are owned or controlled by the Commonwealth of Australia.

Criteria for listing
The National Heritage List is a list of places deemed to be of outstanding heritage significance to Australia. Once on the list, the provisions of the EPBC Act apply. To be included on the list, a nominated place is assessed by the Australian Heritage Council against nine criteria:

 importance in the course, or pattern, of Australia's natural or cultural history
 possession of uncommon, rare or endangered aspects of Australia's natural or cultural history
 potential to yield information that will contribute to an understanding of Australia's natural or cultural history
 importance in demonstrating the principal characteristics of a class of Australia's natural or cultural places or environments
 importance in exhibiting particular aesthetic characteristics valued by a community or cultural group
 importance in demonstrating a high degree of creative or technical achievement at a particular period
 strong or special association with a particular community or cultural group for social, cultural or spiritual reasons
 special association with the life or works of a person, or group of persons, of importance in Australia's natural or cultural history
 importance as part of Indigenous tradition.

In addition, the place must pass a "significance threshold"; it must have 'outstanding' heritage value to the nation as a whole. This is determined by comparison to other similar places. Once the Heritage Council has made an assessment, it forwards a recommendation to the Minister for the Environment, who shall make a determination.

Composition
, the Australian National Heritage List comprised 120 heritage places as follows:

List
The Australian National Heritage List comprises these sites:

Notes
 One of 15 World Heritage places included in the National Heritage List on 21 May 2007.
 Yard 4 North was added on 4 August 2009.

Further notes about table

See also
Commonwealth Heritage List

References

External links

 Australian National Heritage List

 
National Heritage List
Lists of tourist attractions in Australia
Heritage registers in Australia
2003 establishments in Australia
Australian culture-related lists
Australia environment-related lists